The second USS Apache was a United States Coast Guard cutter that served in the United States Navy as a patrol vessel from 1917-1919.

Apache was built in 1891 as the United States Revenue Cutter Service cutter USRC Galveston by Reeder and Sons at Baltimore, Maryland. In 1900, her name was changed to USRC Apache and, upon the creation of the U.S. Coast Guard in 1915, she became USCGC Apache.

Service history
On 30 April 1907 she struck the anchored barge C. T. Rowland in fog in Chesapeake Bay at the lower end of the Craighill Channel. Apache entered U.S. Navy service after the U.S. entered World War I in April 1917 and the Coast Guard came under U.S. Navy control for the duration of the war. She was assigned to the 5th Naval District and patrolled Chesapeake Bay until the end of the war.

Apache returned to U.S. Coast Guard control when the Coast Guard was returned to the jurisdiction of the U.S. Department of the Treasury on 28 August 1919. She remained active in the Coast Guard until 1937, then saw service with the United States Army in the Pacific during World War II before being scrapped in 1950.

References

United States Coast Guard Historian's Office: Webcutters: Apache (1891); originally named Galveston

Patrol vessels of the United States Navy
World War I patrol vessels of the United States
Ships built in Baltimore
1891 ships